Bertalan Bocskay (born 2 March 2002) is a Hungarian professional footballer who plays for Budapest Honvéd as a midfielder.

Career statistics
.

References

2002 births
Living people
Footballers from Budapest
Hungarian footballers
Association football midfielders
Budapest Honvéd FC players
FK TSC Bačka Topola players
Nemzeti Bajnokság I players
Serbian SuperLiga players
Hungarian expatriate footballers
Expatriate footballers in Serbia
Hungarian expatriate sportspeople in Serbia